RJL may refer to:

 RJL, the IATA code for Logroño–Agoncillo Airport, La Rioja, Spain
 RJL, the Indian Railways station code for Rajmahal railway station, Jharkhand, India